Satyal is a surname of Nepali origin. Notable people with the surname include:

Rajiv Satyal (born 1976), American comedian
Rakesh Satyal (born 1980), American novelist

Nepali-language surnames